The 2013–14 Oklahoma City Thunder season is the 6th season of the franchise in Oklahoma City and the 48th in the National Basketball Association (NBA). Despite Russell Westbrook missing 36 games during the season, The Thunder managed to finish the season with 59 wins and 23 losses, earning them the second seed in the Western Conference.

In the playoffs, the Thunder faced the Memphis Grizzlies, the team that defeated them in five games in last season's Semi-finals, in the First Round and won in seven games, then defeated the Los Angeles Clippers in six games in the Semi-finals, before losing to the eventual NBA champion San Antonio Spurs in six games in the Conference Finals.

Previous season
The Thunder finished the 2012–13 season 60–22 to finish in first place in the Northwest Division, first in the Western Conference and qualified for the playoffs. Last season featured Russell Westbrook tearing his lateral meniscus following a collision with Patrick Beverley in game two against the Houston Rockets in the first round. The Thunder will end up defeating the Rockets in six before falling to the Memphis Grizzlies in the second round in five games.

Offseason

Draft picks

The Thunder had two first-round picks and one second-round pick entering the draft. The Thunder owned one first-round pick entering the 2013 NBA Draft lottery. The pick originated from the Toronto Raptors before being traded to the Houston Rockets in the Kyle Lowry trade. The Rockets then traded the pick to the Thunder in the James Harden trade back in 2012. The Thunder ended the night with the twelfth overall pick with only a 2.5% chance into moving into the top three. The Thunder also acquired a second-round pick from the Harden trade that ended up as the thirty-second pick, via the Bobcats. The Thunder traded their 2013 second-round pick in the Robert Vaden trade back in 2011.

On draft night, the Thunder traded the draft rights to Archie Goodwin, the twenty-ninth pick, and cash considerations to the Golden State Warriors in exchange for the draft rights to Andre Roberson, the twenty-sixth pick. The Thunder also traded for the draft rights to Grant Jerrett, the fortieth pick, from the Portland Trail Blazers in exchange for cash considerations.

The Thunder ended 2013 NBA Draft night with Pittsburgh center Steven Adams, Colorado guard Andre Roberson, FC Barcelona guard Alex Abrines and Arizona forward Grant Jerrett.

Trades
On June 27, the Thunder traded the draft rights to Archie Goodwin, the twenty-ninth pick, and cash considerations to the Golden State Warriors in exchange for Andre Roberson, the twenty-sixth pick. The same day, the Thunder traded cash considerations to the Portland Trail Blazers in exchange for Grant Jerrett, the fortieth pick.

On July 11, the Thunder signed-and-traded Kevin Martin and cash considerations to the Minnesota Timberwolves in a three-team trade, for the draft rights to Szymon Szewczyk from Milwaukee. The Thunder also generated a trade exception worth $7 million.

Free agency

For this offseason, free agency began on July 1st, 2013 while the July moratorium ended on July 10. Ronnie Brewer, Derek Fisher and Kevin Martin were set to hit unrestricted free agency. On July 2, it was reported that Kevin Martin agreed to a four-year, $28 million deal with the Minnesota Timberwolves, which he later signed on July 11. The Thunder negotiated a sign-and-trade to generate a trade exception. On July 24, Derek Fisher agreed to a new contract to stay with the Thunder. Sam Presti called Fisher "a valuable member of our team and we are excited to have him back. He has such a positive impact on his teammates and the organization.” On August 28, Ronnie Brewer signed a deal with the Houston Rockets.

On August 7, Ryan Gomes signed a deal with the Thunder. Gomes spent seven season in the NBA before playing internationally with the Artland Dragons in the ProA league.

Front office and coaching changes
On May 15, Thunder assistant Maurice Cheeks was hired as the head coach of the Detroit Pistons. Cheeks served as an assistant coach for the Thunder for four seasons. Cheeks helped guide the Thunder to four playoff appearances, a finals appearance and an overall 212-100 (.707) record.

On July 31, the Thunder announced Robert Pack and Mike Terpstra as assistant coaches. Pack joins the Thunder after serving three seasons as the assistant coach of the Los Angeles Clippers. Terpstra joins the Thunder after twenty years of experience in different capacities at the college, junior college and high school levels, with additional experience in the NBA Development League and the CBA.

Roster

Roster notes
 Thabo Sefolosha changed his jersey number to #25.

Standings

Conference

Division

Game log

Preseason

|- style="background:#cfc;"
| 1
| October 5
| @ Istanbul
| 
| Kevin Durant (24)
| Kevin Durant (8)
| Reggie Jackson (5)
| Ulker Sports Arena12,191
| 1–0
|- style="background:#cfc;"
| 2
| October 8
| @ Philadelphia
| 
| Reggie Jackson (29)
| Serge Ibaka (11)
| Kevin Durant (12)
| Phones 4u Arena13,472
| 2–0
|- style="background:#cfc;"
| 3
| October 15
| Denver
| 
| Kevin Durant (36)
| Ibaka & Roberson (9)
| Serge Ibaka (5)
| Chesapeake Energy Arena18,203
| 3–0
|- style="background:#fcc;"
| 4
| October 17
| New Orleans
| 
| Kevin Durant (25)
| Steven Adams (15)
| Reggie Jackson (9)
| BOK Center17,778
| 3–1
|- style="background:#cfc;"
| 5
| October 20
| Utah
| 
| Reggie Jackson (18)
| Steven Adams (10)
| Reggie Jackson (6)
| Chesapeake Energy Arena18,203
| 4–1
|- style="background:#fcc;"
| 6
| October 22
| @ Phoenix
| 
| Reggie Jackson (18)
| Jeremy Lamb (9)
| Reggie Jackson (4)
| US Airways Center11,526
| 4–2
|- style="background:#fcc;"
| 7
| October 23
| Chicago
| 
| Durant & Lamb (22)
| Steven Adams (7)
| Reggie Jackson (6)
| INTRUST Bank Arena15,004
| 4–3

Regular season

|- style="background:#cfc;"
| 1
| October 30
| @ Utah
| 
| Kevin Durant (42)
| Serge Ibaka (10)
| Reggie Jackson (3)
| EnergySolutions Arena19,911
| 1–0

|- style="background:#fcc;"
| 2
| November 1
| @ Minnesota
| 
| Jeremy Lamb (16)
| Serge Ibaka (9)
| Jackson & Fisher (4)
| Target Center17,433
| 1–1
|- style="background:#cfc;"
| 3
| November 3
| Phoenix
| 
| Kevin Durant (33)
| Durant & Ibaka (10)
| Russell Westbrook (7)
| Chesapeake Energy Arena18,203
| 2–1
|- style="background:#cfc;"
| 4
| November 6
| Dallas
| 
| Kevin Durant (23)
| Serge Ibaka (13)
| Kevin Durant (10)
| Chesapeake Energy Arena18,203
| 3–1
|- style="background:#cfc;"
| 5
| November 8
| @ Detroit
| 
| Kevin Durant (37)
| Steven Adams (10)
| Kevin Durant (7)
| Palace of Auburn Hills15,624
| 4–1
|- style="background:#cfc;"
| 6
| November 10
| Washington
| 
| Kevin Durant (33)
| Kevin Durant (13)
| Kevin Durant (6)
| Chesapeake Energy Arena18,203
| 5–1
|- style="background:#fcc;"
| 7
| November 13
| @ L.A. Clippers
| 
| Kevin Durant (33)
| Kevin Durant (6)
| Durant & Westbrook (10)
| Staples Center19,273
| 5–2
|- style="background:#fcc;"
| 8
| November 14
| @ Golden State
| 
| Russell Westbrook (31)
| Serge Ibaka (13)
| Kevin Durant (8)
| Oracle Arena19,596
| 5–3
|- style="background:#cfc;"
| 9
| November 16
| @ Milwaukee
| 
| Russell Westbrook (26)
| Serge Ibaka (20)
| Russell Westbrook (4)
| BMO Harris Bradley Center15,984
| 6–3
|- style="background:#cfc;"
| 10
| November 18
| Denver
| 
| Kevin Durant (38)
| Russell Westbrook (12)
| Russell Westbrook (7)
| Chesapeake Energy Arena18,203
| 7–3
|- style="background:#cfc;"
| 11
| November 21
| L.A. Clippers
| 
| Kevin Durant (28)
| Steven Adams (7)
| Kevin Durant (8)
| Chesapeake Energy Arena18,203
| 8–3
|- style="background:#cfc;"
| 12
| November 24
| Utah
| 
| Kevin Durant (19)
| Serge Ibaka (11)
| Reggie Jackson (7)
| Chesapeake Energy Arena18,203
| 9–3
|- style="background:#cfc;"
| 13
| November 27
| San Antonio
| 
| Kevin Durant (24)
| Kevin Durant (13)
| Russell Westbrook (8)
| Chesapeake Energy Arena18,203
| 10–3
|- style="background:#cfc;"
| 14
| November 29
| Golden State
| 
| Russell Westbrook (34)
| Durant & Ibaka (13)
| Russell Westbrook (7)
| Chesapeake Energy Arena18,203
| 11–3

|- style="background:#cfc;"
| 15
| December 1
| Minnesota
| 
| Kevin Durant (32)
| Kevin Durant (10)
| Kevin Durant (12)
| Chesapeake Energy Arena18,203
| 12–3
|- style="background:#cfc;"
| 16
| December 3
| @ Sacramento
| 
| Kevin Durant (27)
| Kevin Durant (11)
| Russell Westbrook (7)
| Sleep Train Arena15,089
| 13–3
|- style="background:#fcc;"
| 17
| December 4
| @ Portland
| 
|Kevin Durant (33)
| Serge Ibaka (10)
| Russell Westbrook (5)
| Moda Center18,950
| 13–4
|- style="background:#cfc;"
| 18
| December 6
| @ New Orleans
| 
| Kevin Durant (29)
| Serge Ibaka (13)
| Durant, Westbrook &Jackson(4)
| New Orleans Arena17,694
| 14–4
|- style="background:#cfc;"
| 19
| December 8
| Indiana
| 
| Kevin Durant (36)
| Kevin Durant (10)
| Russell Westbrook (13)
| Chesapeake Energy Arena18,203
| 15–4
|- style="background:#cfc;"
| 20
| December 10
| @ Atlanta
| 
| Kevin Durant (30)
| Durant & Ibaka (10)
| Russell Westbrook (11)
| Philips Arena12,503
| 16–4
|- style="background:#cfc;"
| 21
| December 11
| @ Memphis
| 
| Russell Westbrook (27)
| Serge Ibaka (7)
| Russell Westbrook (9)
| FedExForum16,345
| 17–4
|- style="background:#cfc;"
| 22
| December 13
| L.A. Lakers
| 
| Kevin Durant (31)
| Serge Ibaka (10)
| Russell Westbrook (12)
| Chesapeake Energy Arena18,203
| 18–4
|- style="background:#cfc;"
| 23
| December 15
| Orlando
| 
| Kevin Durant (28)
| Russell Westbrook (12)
| Russell Westbrook (6)
| Chesapeake Energy Arena18,203
| 19–4
|- style="background:#cfc;"
| 24
| December 17
| @ Denver
| 
| Kevin Durant (30)
| Russell Westbrook (13)
| Russell Westbrook (8)
| Pepsi Center17,035
| 20–4
|- style="background:#cfc;"
| 25
| December 19
| Chicago
| 
| Kevin Durant (32)
| Kevin Durant (9)
| Russell Westbrook (10)
| Chesapeake Energy Arena18,203
| 21–4
|- style="background:#cfc;"
| 26
| December 21
| @ San Antonio
| 
| Russell Westbrook (31)
| Serge Ibaka (14)
| Russell Westbrook (4)
| AT&T Center18,581
| 22–4
|- style="background:#fcc;"
| 27
| December 22
| Toronto
| 
| Russell Westbrook (27)
| Russell Westbrook (9)
| Westbrook &Jackson (5)
| Chesapeake Energy Arena18,203
| 22–5
|- style="background:#cfc;"
| 28
| December 25
| @ New York
| 
| Kevin Durant (29)
| Russell Westbrook (13)
| Russell Westbrook (10)
| Madison Square Garden19,812
| 23–5
|- style="background:#cfc;"
| 29
| December 27
| @ Charlotte
| 
| Kevin Durant (34)
| Kevin Durant (12)
| Kevin Durant (6)
| Time Warner Cable Arena18,129
| 24–5
|- style="background:#cfc;"
| 30
| December 29
| Houston
| 
| Kevin Durant (33)
| Kevin Durant (13)
| Reggie Jackson (8)
| Chesapeake Energy Arena18,203
| 25–5
|- style="background:#fcc;"
| 31
| December 31
| Portland
| 
| Kevin Durant (37)
| Kevin Durant (14)
| Reggie Jackson (6)
| Chesapeake Energy Arena18,203
| 25–6

|- style="background:#fcc;"
| 32
| January 2
| Brooklyn
| 
| Kevin Durant (24)
| Serge Ibaka (11)
| Reggie Jackson (5)
| Chesapeake Energy Arena18,203
| 25–7
|- style="background:#cfc;"
| 33
| January 4
| @ Minnesota
| 
| Kevin Durant (48)
| Steven Adams (9)
| Kevin Durant (7)
| Target Center18,065
| 26–7
|- style="background:#cfc;"
| 34
| January 5
| Boston
| 
| Reggie Jackson (27)
| Serge Ibaka (11)
| Kevin Durant (8)
| Chesapeake Energy Arena18,203
| 27–7
|- style="background:#fcc;"
| 35
| January 7
| @ Utah
| 
| Kevin Durant (48)
| Kevin Durant (7)
| Reggie Jackson (6)
| EnergySolutions Arena18,547
| 27–8
|- style="background:#fcc;"
| 36
| January 9
| @ Denver
| 
| Kevin Durant (30)
| Serge Ibaka (10)
| Reggie Jackson (5)
| Pepsi Center17,315
| 27−9
|- style="background:#cfc;"
| 37
| January 11
| Milwaukee
| 
| Kevin Durant (33)
| Serge Ibaka (17)
| Kevin Durant (7)
| Chesapeake Energy Arena18,203
| 28–9
|- style="background:#fcc;"
| 38
| January 14
| @ Memphis
| 
| Kevin Durant (37)
| Ibaka & Adams (9)
| Kevin Durant (4)
| FedExForum17,177
| 28–10
|- style="background:#cfc;"
| 39
| January 16
| @ Houston
| 
| Kevin Durant (36)
| Serge Ibaka (15)
| Kevin Durant (7)
| Toyota Center18,231
| 29–10
|- style="background:#cfc;"
| 40
| January 17
| Golden State
| 
| Kevin Durant (54)
|Kendrick Perkins (12)
| Durant &Jackson (6)
| Chesapeake Energy Arena18,203
| 30–10
|- style="background:#cfc;"
| 41
| January 19
| Sacramento
| 
| Kevin Durant (30)
| Adams & Collison (7)
| Kevin Durant (9)
| Chesapeake Energy Arena18,203
| 31–10
|- style="background:#cfc;"
| 42
| January 21
| Portland
| 
| Kevin Durant (46)
| Kendrick Perkins (8)
| Reggie Jackson (5)
| Chesapeake Energy Arena18,203
| 32–10
|- style="background:#cfc;"
| 43
| January 22
| @ San Antonio
| 
| Kevin Durant (36)
| Serge Ibaka (9)
| Reggie Jackson (8)
| AT&T Center18,581
| 33–10
|- style="background:#cfc;"
| 44
| January 24
| @ Boston
| 
| Serge Ibaka (21)
| Kendrick Perkins (9)
| Reggie Jackson (8)
| TD Garden18,624
| 34–10
|- style="background:#cfc;"
| 45
| January 25
| @ Philadelphia
| 
|Kevin Durant (32)
| Kevin Durant (14)
| Kevin Durant (10)
| Wells Fargo Center19,217
| 35–10
|- style="background:#cfc;"
| 46
| January 27
| Atlanta
| 
| Kevin Durant (41)
| Kendrick Perkins (7)
| Durant, Jackson & Collison (5)
| Chesapeake Energy Arena18,203
| 36–10
|- style="background:#cfc;"
| 47
| January 29
| @ Miami
| 
| Kevin Durant (33)
| Serge Ibaka (8)
| Kevin Durant (5)
| American Airlines Arena19,673
| 37–10
|- style="background:#cfc;"
| 48
| January 31
| @ Brooklyn
| 
| Kevin Durant (26)
| Serge Ibaka (9)
| Durant & Jackson (7)
| Barclays Center17,732
| 38–10

|- style="background:#fcc;"
| 49
| February 1
| @ Washington
| 
| Kevin Durant (26)
| Ibaka & Jackson (8)
| Kevin Durant (7)
| Verizon Center20,356
| 38–11
|- style="background:#cfc;"
| 50
| February 3
| Memphis
| 
| Kevin Durant (31)
| Serge Ibaka (12)
| Kevin Durant (8)
| Chesapeake Energy Arena18,203
| 39–11
|- style="background:#cfc;"
| 51
| February 5
| Minnesota
| 
| Kevin Durant (26)
| Kendrick Perkins (12)
| Reggie Jackson (9)
| Chesapeake Energy Arena18,203
| 40–11
|- style="background:#fcc;"
| 52
| February 7
| @ Orlando
| 
| Kevin Durant (29)
| Serge Ibaka (6)
| Kevin Durant (12)
| Amway Center15,599
| 40–12
|- style="background:#cfc;"
| 53
| February 9
| New York
| 
| Kevin Durant (41)
| Kendrick Perkins (11)
| Kevin Durant (9)
| Chesapeake Energy Arena18,203
| 41–12
|- style="background:#cfc;"
| 54
| February 11
| @ Portland
| 
| Kevin Durant (36)
| Serge Ibaka (11)
| Reggie Jackson (5)
| Moda Center20,018
| 42–12
|- style="background:#cfc;"
| 55
| February 13
| @ L.A. Lakers
| 
| Kevin Durant (43)
| Kevin Durant (12)
| Kevin Durant (7)
| Staples Center18,997
| 43–12
|- align="center"
|colspan="9" bgcolor="#bbcaff"|All-Star Break
|- style="background:#fcc;"
| 56
| February 20
| Miami
| 
| Kevin Durant (28)
| Durant & Ibaka (8)
| Reggie Jackson (5)
| Chesapeake Energy Arena18,203
| 43–13
|- style="background:#fcc;"
| 57
| February 23
| L.A. Clippers
| 
| Kevin Durant (42)
| Ibaka, Collison & Adams (6)
| Kevin Durant (6)
| Chesapeake Energy Arena18,203
| 43–14
|- style="background:#fcc;"
| 58
| February 26
| Cleveland
| 
| Kevin Durant (28)
| Serge Ibaka (13)
| Durant & Westbrook (9)
| Chesapeake Energy Arena18,203
| 43–15
|- style="background:#cfc;"
| 59
| February 28
| Memphis
| 
| Kevin Durant (37)
| Serge Ibaka (9)
| Russell Westbrook (6)
| Chesapeake Energy Arena18,203
| 44–15

|- style="background:#cfc;"
| 60
| March 2
| Charlotte
| 
| Kevin Durant (28)
| Serge Ibaka (10)
| Durant & Westbrook (5)
| Chesapeake Energy Arena18,203
| 45–15
|- style="background:#cfc;"
| 61
| March 4
| Philadelphia
| 
| Kevin Durant (42)
| Russell Westbrook (10)
| Russell Westbrook (14)
| Chesapeake Energy Arena18,203
| 46–15
|- style="background:#fcc;"
| 62
| March 6
| @ Phoenix
| 
| Russell Westbrook (36)
| Russell Westbrook (9)
| Russell Westbrook (9)
| US Airways Center17,816
| 46–16
|- style="background:#fcc;"
| 63
| March 9
| @ L.A. Lakers
| 
| Kevin Durant (27)
| Serge Ibaka  (15)
| Kevin Durant (12)
| Staples Center18,997
| 46–17
|- style="background:#cfc;"
| 64
| March 11
| Houston
| 
| Kevin Durant (40)
| Serge Ibaka (16)
| Russell Westbrook (7)
| Chesapeake Energy Arena18,203
| 47–17
|- style="background:#cfc;"
| 65
| March 13
| L.A. Lakers
| 
| Durant & Westbrook (29)
| Serge Ibaka (13)
| Russell Westbrook (9)
| Chesapeake Energy Arena18,203
| 48–17
|- style="background:#fcc;"
| 66
| March 16
| Dallas
| 
| Kevin Durant (30)
| Nick Collison (7)
| Kevin Durant (4)
| Chesapeake Energy Arena18,203
| 48–18
|- style="background:#cfc;"
| 67
| March 17
| @ Chicago
| 
| Kevin Durant (35)
| Kevin Durant (12)
| Russell Westbrook (9)
| United Center22,261
| 49–18
|- style="background:#cfc;"
| 68
| March 20
| @ Cleveland
| 
| Kevin Durant (35)
| Durant & Ibaka (11)
| Durant & Jackson (6)
| Quicken Loans Arena18,246
| 50–18
|- style="background:#cfc;"
| 69
| March 21
| @ Toronto
| 
| Kevin Durant (51)
| Durant & Jackson (12)
| Kevin Durant (7)
| Air Canada Centre19,800
| 51–18
|- style="background:#cfc;"
| 70
| March 24
| Denver
| 
| Kevin Durant (27)
| Serge Ibaka (7)
| Reggie Jackson (11)
| Chesapeake Energy Arena18,203
| 52–18
|- style="background:#fcc;"
| 71
| March 25
| @ Dallas
| 
| Kevin Durant (43)
| Westbrook & Collison (7)
| Westbrook & Jackson (8)
| American Airlines Center19,607
| 52–19
|- style="background:#cfc;"
| 72
| March 28
| Sacramento
| 
| Kevin Durant (29)
| Serge Ibaka (8)
| Durant &Westbrook (6)
| Chesapeake Energy Arena18,203
| 53–19
|- style="background:#cfc;"
| 73
| March 30
| Utah
| 
| Kevin Durant (31)
| Steven Adams (8)
| Kevin Durant (9)
| Chesapeake Energy Arena18,203
| 54–19

|- style="background:#cfc;"
| 74
| April 3
| San Antonio
| 
| Kevin Durant (28)
| Serge Ibaka (12)
| Russell Westbrook (6)
| Chesapeake Energy Arena18,203
| 55–19
|- style="background:#fcc;"
| 75
| April 4
| @ Houston
| 
| Kevin Durant (28)
| Kevin Durant (12)
| Reggie Jackson (7)
| Toyota Center18,407
| 55–20
|- style="background:#fcc;"
| 76
| April 6
| @ Phoenix
| 
| Kevin Durant (38)
| Kevin Durant (11)
| Russell Westbrook (8)
| US Airways Center18,422
| 55–21
|- style="background:#cfc;"
| 77
| April 8
| @ Sacramento
| 
| Durant & Butler (23)
| Nick Collison (7)
| Jackson & Fisher (5)
| Sleep Train Arena16,696
| 56–21
|- style="background:#cfc;"
| 78
| April 9
| @ L.A. Clippers
| 
| Russell Westbrook (30)
| Russell Westbrook (11)
| Russell Westbrook (6)
| Staples Center19,459
| 57–21
|- style="background:#cfc;"
| 79
| April 11
| New Orleans
| 
| Kevin Durant (27)
| Serge Ibaka (10)
| Westbrook & Jackson (7)
| Chesapeake Energy Arena18,203
| 58–21
|- style="background:#fcc;"
| 80
| April 13
| @ Indiana
| 
| Kevin Durant (38)
| Russell Westbrook (9)
| Russell Westbrook (7)
| Bankers Life Fieldhouse18,165
| 58–22
|- style="background:#fcc;"
| 81
| April 14
| @ New Orleans
| 
| Kevin Durant (25)
| Serge Ibaka (16)
| Kevin Durant (6)
| Smoothie King Center17,024
| 58–23
|- style="background:#cfc;"
| 82
| April 16
| Detroit
| 
| Kevin Durant (42)
| Serge Ibaka (15)
| Russell Westbrook (8)
| Chesapeake Energy Arena18,203
| 59–23

Playoffs

|- style="background:#cfc;"
| 1
| April 19
| Memphis
| 
| Kevin Durant (33)
| Russell Westbrook (10)
| Kevin Durant (7)
| Chesapeake Energy Arena18,203
| 1–0
|- style="background:#fcc;"
| 2
| April 21
| Memphis
| 
| Kevin Durant (36)
| Durant & Ibaka (11)
| Russell Westbrook (8)
| Chesapeake Energy Arena18,203
| 1–1
|- style="background:#fcc;"
| 3
| April 24
| @ Memphis
| 
| Durant & Westbrook (30)
| Russell Westbrook (13)
| Durant & Jackson (3)
| FedExForum18,119
| 1–2
|- style="background:#cfc;"
| 4
| April 26
| @ Memphis
| 
| Reggie Jackson (32)
| Serge Ibaka (14)
| Russell Westbrook (7)
| FedExForum18,119
| 2–2
|- style="background:#fcc;"
| 5
| April 29
| Memphis
| 
| Russell Westbrook (30)
| Serge Ibaka (12)
| Russell Westbrook (13)
| Chesapeake Energy Arena18,203
| 2–3
|- style="background:#cfc;"
| 6
| May 1
| @ Memphis
| 
| Kevin Durant (36)
| Kevin Durant (10)
| Russell Westbrook (5)
| FedExForum18,119
| 3–3
|- style="background:#cfc;"
| 7
| May 3
| Memphis
| 
| Kevin Durant (33)
| Russell Westbrook (10)
| Russell Westbrook (16)
| Chesapeake Energy Arena18,203
| 4–3

|- style="background:#fcc;"
| 1
| May 5
| L.A. Clippers
| 
| Russell Westbrook (29)
| Ibaka, Butler & Lamb (6)
| Reggie Jackson (5)
| Chesapeake Energy Arena18,203
| 0–1
|- style="background:#cfc;"
| 2
| May 7
| L.A. Clippers
| 
| Kevin Durant (32)
| Kevin Durant (12)
| Russell Westbrook (10)
| Chesapeake Energy Arena18,203
| 1–1
|- style="background:#cfc;"
| 3
| May 9
| @ L.A. Clippers
| 
| Kevin Durant (36)
| Steven Adams (9)
| Russell Westbrook (13)
| Staples Center19,530
| 2–1
|- style="background:#fcc;"
| 4
| May 11
| @ L.A. Clippers
| 
| Kevin Durant (40)
| Kevin Durant (7)
| Russell Westbrook (8)
| Staples Center19,365
| 2–2
|- style="background:#cfc;"
| 5
| May 13
| L.A. Clippers
| 
| Russell Westbrook (38)
| Kevin Durant (10)
| Russell Westbrook (6)
| Chesapeake Energy Arena18,203
| 3–2
|- style="background:#cfc;"
| 6
| May 15
| @ L.A. Clippers
| 
| Kevin Durant (39)
| Kevin Durant (16)
| Russell Westbrook (12)
| Staples Center19,565
| 4–2

|- style="background:#fcc;"
| 1
| May 19
| @ San Antonio
| 
| Kevin Durant (28)
| Durant & Perkins (9)
| Russell Westbrook (7)
| AT&T Center18,581
| 0–1
|- style="background:#fcc;"
| 2
| May 21
| @ San Antonio
| 
| Durant & Westbrook (15)
| Steven Adams (8)
| Russell Westbrook (5)
| AT&T Center18,581
| 0–2
|- style="background:#cfc;"
| 3
| May 25
| San Antonio
| 
| Russell Westbrook (26)
| Kevin Durant (10)
| Russell Westbrook (7)
| Chesapeake Energy Arena18,203
| 1–2
|- style="background:#cfc;"
| 4
| May 27
| San Antonio
| 
| Russell Westbrook (40)
| Kendrick Perkins (10)
| Russell Westbrook (10)
| Chesapeake Energy Arena18,203
| 2–2
|- style="background:#fcc;"
| 5
| May 29
| @ San Antonio
| 
| Kevin Durant (25)
| Kendrick Perkins (6)
| Russell Westbrook (7)
| AT&T Center18,581
| 2–3
|- style="background:#fcc;"
| 6
| May 31
| San Antonio
| 
| Russell Westbrook (34)
| Kevin Durant (14)
| Russell Westbrook (8)
| Chesapeake Energy Arena18,203
| 2–4

Player statistics

Regular season

 Led team in statistic
After all games.
‡ Waived during the season
† Traded during the season
≠ Acquired during the season

Playoffs

 Led team in statistic
After all games.

Individual game highs

Awards and records

Awards

Transactions

Overview

Trades

Free agency

Re-signed

Additions

Subtractions

References

Oklahoma City Thunder seasons
Oklahoma City Thunder
2013 in sports in Oklahoma
2014 in sports in Oklahoma